Starr Hill Township is an inactive township in Washington County, Arkansas, United States.

A variant name was "Star Hill Township". The township was established in 1884.

References

Townships in Washington County, Arkansas
Townships in Arkansas